Serena Williams defeated Garbiñe Muguruza in the final, 6–4, 6–4 to win the ladies' singles tennis title at the 2015 Wimbledon Championships. It was her sixth Wimbledon singles title and her 21st major singles title overall. With the win, Williams completed her second "Serena Slam" (a non-calendar year Grand Slam), having won the preceding US Open, Australian Open and French Open. This also marked the first Channel Slam (winning the French Open and Wimbledon in the same year) in women's singles since Williams herself in 2002.

Muguruza became the first Spaniard to reach the final since Arantxa Sánchez Vicario in 1996. She would win the title two years later.

Petra Kvitová was the defending champion, but lost to Jelena Janković in the third round.

This was the first major main draw appearance of future French Open champion Jeļena Ostapenko, who was awarded a wild card; she lost to Kristina Mladenovic in the second round.

Seeds

Qualifying

Draw

Finals

Top half

Section 1

Section 2

Section 3

Section 4

Bottom half

Section 5

Section 6

Section 7

Section 8

Championship match statistics

References

External links
 Main draw
2015 Wimbledon Championships – Women's draws and results at the International Tennis Federation

Women's Singles
Wimbledon Championship by year – Women's singles
2015 in women's tennis
2015 in English women's sport